Moira Deeming is an Australian politician. She is a member of the Liberal Party and is a member of the Victorian Legislative Council, representing the Western Metropolitan Region since November 2022. She was previously a councillor for the Melton City Council representing the Watts Ward.

In March 2023 it was announced by the leader of the opposition, John Pesutto, that he would move to have her expelled from the parliamentary Liberal Party after she spoke at a women’s rights rally outside the Victorian Parliament.  The rally was also attended by rival pro-transgender activists and by neo-Nazi groups. The latter  repeatedly performed Nazi salutes from the steps of Parliament. Moira Deeming vehemently condemned their actions in her speech.

Early life and education 
Deeming has a Bachelor of International Relations from La Trobe University and a Post-Graduate Diploma of Education from the University of Melbourne. She has worked as a teacher for over a decade, before leaving to homeschool her children.

Beliefs 
Deeming described the anti-bullying and inclusion program Safe Schools as "sleazy". In 2020 she wrote of conversion therapy as "highly successful, low risk" — months later the Liberal Party made a statement that they "strongly oppose[d]" it. On 18 March 2023, Deeming spoke at the Let Women Speak event, a part of Kellie Jay Keen's speaking tour.

She is pro-life and believes the laws legalising abortion need to be repealed, and believes that rape victims should reject abortions and turn to God and to the church instead.  She is against voluntary euthanasia. 

Deeming is against the COVID-19 vaccine and accompanying mandates, and considers vaccine passports "immoral" and a form of "segregation". As of September 2021 she said in an interview that she was unvaccinated, and that she'll be "waiting" and that she is "reserving her judgement" due to "concerns". 

Deeming is against changing the date of Australia Day.

Political career

2014 Victorian State Election 
Deeming stood as a candidate for the Liberal Party in the lower house for the seat of St Albans at the 2014 Victorian state election. She secured 26.9% of the vote, losing to the Labor Party's Natalie Suleyman.

2018 Victorian State Election 
In 2018 at the state election Deeming stood as a candidate for the Liberal Party for the upper house Western Metropolitan Region seat in the Victorian Legislative Council. She received 356 first preference votes (0.08%) and failed to gain a seat.

2020 Melton City Council Election 
Deeming stood as a candidate for the Watts Ward at the 2020 Melton City Council election on 24 October, receiving 21.49% of the primary vote and successfully securing the second allocation.

2022 Federal Election 
Following the 2022 Australian federal election, it was reported in The Age that on 26 March the Victorian Liberal Party's administrative committee voted for Deeming to run in the lower house seat of Gorton. Before she was able to be endorsed, a top party official relayed the view of Scott Morrison's Office that "negative media coverage of Deeming's hardline social views could distract" from Morrison's campaign. Reportedly, another vote was held and a different candidate was picked.

2022 Victorian State Election 
On 23 July, Deeming was endorsed by the Liberal Party to contest the upper house Western Metropolitan Region seat in the Victorian Legislative Council to replace Bernie Finn at the Victorian state election.

Deeming’s preselection was considered controversial because she replaced the similarly right wing Bernie Finn at the top of the Liberal ticket, following Finn's expulsion from the Liberal Party after making "inflammatory social media posts". Finn, who contested the election as a Democratic Labour Party candidate, was reported to be ‘delighted’ at Deeming’s preselection. Andrew Elsbury, a moderate Liberal Party member who held the seat from 2010–2014 quit the party in response to her preselection, describing it as the "final straw". Deeming was successfully elected to the Legislative Council.

In Deeming's maiden speech before parliament, she criticized "left-wing school curriculums" and the "decriminalisation of sex work".

Activism
On 18 March 2023, Deeming spoke at the "Let Women Speak" women's rights protest that was separately attended by the neo-Nazi group National Socialist Network and its leader Thomas Sewell, with the neo-Nazis (but not the Let Women Speak protestors) repeatedly engaged in Nazi salutes, and carried far-right extremist banners.

In a public statement describing Deeming’s position as “untenable” due to her “involvement in organising, promoting and participating in a rally with speakers and other organisers who themselves have been publicly associated with far right-wing extremist groups including neo-Nazi activists” Liberal opposition leader, John Pesutto moved to expel her from the party..

Personal life 

Deeming is Presbyterian, though attended the Catholic high school St. Francis Xavier College.

References 

Politicians from Melbourne
Victoria (Australia) local councillors
Year of birth missing (living people)
Living people
Australian Presbyterians
Liberal Party of Australia politicians
La Trobe University alumni
University of Melbourne alumni
Members of the Victorian Legislative Council
Women members of the Victorian Legislative Council